Colin Steele is a singer/music producer/actor born around June 1986.

Background
Colin Steele began recording and performing dance/house music with Dj International records at age 11 in Chicago Illinois.

Acting
Colin Steele landed the role of Jermaine Jackson in The Jacksons: An American Dream. He hosted the children's television talk show Club HT Live, and sang lead vocals on "In The Still Of The Night" in Whoopi Goldberg's Sister Act II. Colin was accepted to UCLA and graduated with a BA in music.

Music
Steele began performing in clubs in Los Angeles, Paris, and New York City. He decided to move to New York City. In 2006 Colin released his first CD of music, titled Colin Steele. In 2009 Colin flew to Rio de Janeiro and filmed the music video for the song "More Of You".

References

External links
 Colin Steele's Website

American male singers
Living people
Year of birth missing (living people)